Diary of June (also known as Bystanders) is a 2005 South Korean mystery-crime film starring Shin Eun-kyung, Yunjin Kim and Eric Mun. The film was released to South Korean cinemas December 1st, 2005 where it received a total of 697,980 admissions nationwide.

Plot
Two boys from the same school are murdered. In their stomachs there are capsules containing scraps from a diary that describe the next victims. Suspecting there might be the possibility that a killer is at the same school, detective Chu Ja-young (Shin Eun-kyung), with her rookie partner Kim Dong-wook (Eric Mun) search the school to find identical handwriting that matches that of the diary excerpts. When they finally find the matching one, they're told that Jin-mo, the student who wrote the text, has died already in a car accident one month previous. As Ja-young and Dong-wook discover Jin-mo's secret diary, more clues are revealed concerning the next victim. They also discover that Jin-mo was bullied by his schoolmates, and that there is a darker secret to be revealed.

Cast
 Shin Eun-kyung as Chu Ja-young
 Yunjin Kim as Seo Yoon-hee
 Eric Mun as Kim Dong-wook
 Yoon Joo-sang as Squad leader Yang
 Maeng Se-chang as Jang Joon-ha
 Kim Kkot-bi as young Yoon-hee
 Park Hyun-young as Dong-wook's friend
 Oh Jung-se as pickpocket
 Kim Ji-min as Choi Hae-joon
 Yoo Hyun-ji as sesame leaves girl
 Jang Ki-bum as nobleman

References

External links 
 
 
 
 

2005 horror films
2005 films
South Korean horror films
2000s Korean-language films
Showbox films
2000s South Korean films